The Gulf Coast Rebel was a streamlined passenger train operated by the Gulf, Mobile and Ohio Railroad (GM&O) between St. Louis, Missouri and Mobile, Alabama. It operated from 1940 to 1958. Unlike the similarly named Rebels, the Gulf Coast Rebel used conventional locomotive-pulled equipment. The train was the last GM&O service south of St. Louis, Missouri when it was discontinued in 1958.

History 

In 1935 the Gulf, Mobile and Northern Railroad (GM&N), a predecessor of the GM&O, introduced the Rebel between New Orleans, Louisiana and Jackson, Tennessee. It was the first lightweight streamliner in the Southern United States. In the fashion of mid-1930s streamliners each consist was built as a cohesive set with streamlined power car, although the cars were not articulated. Even before its merger with the Mobile and Ohio Railroad in September 1940 the GM&N had begun assembling equipment for a new Rebel.

The new Gulf Coast Rebel began operation on October 29, 1940, using streamlined heavyweight cars. New ALCO DL-105 diesel locomotives pulled the train which gained the nickname "Big Rebel", differentiating it from the "Little Rebels" which remained in service. The new train was painted in the same red-and-silver paint scheme as the Little Rebels and included hostess service, another innovation from the original service. The trains operated on an overnight schedule between St. Louis and Mobile, using the former M&O main line via Meridian, Mississippi.

The GM&O's merger with the Alton Railroad in 1947 brought several changes to the Gulf Coast Rebel. The most obvious was the change in appearance as the train received the Alton's maroon-and-red paint scheme. In addition, the train received new lightweight cars built by American Car and Foundry. Both the Little and Big Rebels were the victim of the worsening passenger market in the 1950s. The GM&O discontinued the original Rebels in 1954 and the Gulf Coast Rebel, its last passenger train south of St. Louis, on October 14, 1958.

Equipment 
The original Gulf Coast Rebel used a heavyweight consist which received some streamlining and other cosmetic enhancements. Two consists were necessary to protect the service. Each had a mail car, baggage car, coach, buffet-coach, and sleeping car (Tower-series 8-section 1-drawing room 3-double bedroom cars Show Me and Deep South). As mentioned above, American Car and Foundry delivered new lightweight cars to the GM&O in 1947–1948 which were used throughout the system. These included 68-seat coaches, 31-seat parlor cars, and four 4-section 8-roomette 1-compartment 3-double bedroom sleeping cars. Originally ALCO DL-105s (styled by Otto Kuhler) handled the Gulf Coast Rebel. Later motive power included the ALCO PA-1 and the uncommon Baldwin DR-6.

References

External links
1950 timetable

Night trains of the United States
Passenger trains of the Gulf, Mobile and Ohio Railroad
Railway services introduced in 1940
Named passenger trains of the United States
Railway services discontinued in 1970